Like the Wind is a 2013 Italian biographical film directed by Marco Simon Puccioni. The film narrates the story of Armida Miserere, the first woman to direct a high security jail in Italy.

Cast 
 Valeria Golino - Armida Miserere
 Filippo Timi - Umberto Mormile
 Francesco Scianna - Riccardo Rauso
 Chiara Caselli - Rita Rauso
 Marcello Mazzarella - Maresciallo Stefano Prati
  - Maresciallo Antonio Mangi
  - Isabella
  - Maurizio

References

External links 

2010s biographical films
Italian biographical drama films
2010s Italian films